The Springfield Express was an AAU-sanctioned junior ice hockey team based in Springfield, Missouri and plays home games at the Mediacom Ice Park. The team is a member of the Western States Hockey League (WSHL).

History
The franchise was founded in 2005 as the Cajun Catahoulas, based in Carencro, Louisiana. It moved after the 2008–09 season to North Richland Hills, Texas and was renamed the Texas Renegades. After the 2008–09 season in North Richland Hills, the team was moved to Blades Multiplex Arena in Rio Rancho, New Mexico and became the New Mexico Renegades. In 2011, the Renegades were purchased by Revolution Sports Management, Inc.

Following the 2013–14 season, the team announced a move to Springfield, Missouri and the Mediacom Ice Park and a name change to the Springfield Express. The team becomes the first junior hockey franchise in Springfield since the Springfield Spirit of the NAHL relocated to Alaska in 2005.

On April 29, 2016, after a successful 2015–16 season, it was announced that Revolution Sports Management had finalized the sale of the Express to 417 Sports Management. The new ownership group, based in Springfield, is owned by Dr. Brenton and Andrea Coger, formerly a billet family and team physician. Co-owner Andrea Coger was later accused stalking, sexually harassing, threatening a former player with whom she had apparently had a relationship while he was one of her legal-age billet players during the 2016–17 season.

During the 2017–18 season, the team went through an ownership transition with four investors to keep the team operating. After the season, the owners announced they could not negotiate lower fees for an arena lease and would suspend operations for the 2018–19 season.

Season-by-season records

References

External links
 Springfield Express webpage
 Western States Hockey League Webpage

Amateur ice hockey teams in Missouri
Sports in Springfield, Missouri
2014 establishments in Missouri
2018 disestablishments in Missouri
Ice hockey clubs established in 2014
Ice hockey clubs disestablished in 2018